Lactarius thyinos is an edible mushroom of the genus Lactarius found in bogs in Canada and the northeastern United States. It is common and easily identifiable.

References

Edible fungi
thyinos
Fungi described in 1960
Fungi of Canada
Fungi of the United States
Fungi without expected TNC conservation status